Cleeve Hill may refer to the following places in England:

Cleeve Hill, Gloucestershire
Cleeve Hill, a village under the hill in Woodmancote parish
Cleeve Hill SSSI, Berkshire
Cleeve Hill SSSI, Somerset
Cleve Hill solar farm, Kent Proposed 350MW solar farm near Faversham, Kent

See also 
 Cleveland Hills, in North Yorkshire, England
 Cleveland Hill, New York, in the United States